Nancy Berliner (born on March 17, 1954) is an American hematologist. In January 2020, Berliner was named the editor-in-chief of the journal Blood.

Early life and education
Berliner was born on March 17, 1954, to Robert Berliner, a physician who became dean of the Yale Medical School (1973-1984). She graduated summa cum laude from Yale University and received her medical degree from the Yale School of Medicine. Upon completing medical school, Berliner chose to train in hematology and became the first female chief resident at the Brigham and Women's Hospital.

Career
Berliner finished her residency in 1986 and returned to Yale New Haven Hospital as their interim chief of hematology and as professor of internal medicine and genetics at their School of Medicine. In 2006, Berliner was promoted to Yale's chief of the Hematology Division in the Department of Medicine. While serving in this role, she was elected President of the American Society of Hematology and named a member of the National Academy of Medicine in 2010. 

In 2017, Berliner was named the inaugural H. Franklin Bunn, MD, Distinguished Chair in Medicine at Brigham and Women’s Hospital. In January 2020, Berliner was named the editor-in-chief of the journal Blood.

Personal life
Berliner married architect Alan J. Plattus in 1984.

References

External links

Living people
1954 births
American hematologists
Medical journal editors
Members of the National Academy of Medicine
Yale University alumni
Yale School of Medicine alumni
Yale University faculty
Presidents of the American Society of Hematology